Rei Hance (born Heather Donahue; December 22, 1974) is an American writer, businesswoman, and retired actress. She is known for her roles as Heather in the 1999 film The Blair Witch Project and Mary Crawford in the miniseries Taken. Hance was credited under her birth name in her acting roles and for her first book before legally changing her name to Rei Hance sometime after 2016 and before 2021.

Early life and education
Hance was born Heather Donahue on December 22, 1974, in Upper Darby, Pennsylvania, the daughter of Joan, an office manager, and James Donahue, a printer.

Hance graduated from Philadelphia's University of the Arts in 1995 with a BFA in theater, and also performed in productions at the Battersea Arts Centre in London, England, where she apprenticed in conjunction with the University of the Arts London. 

After completing her studies, she worked as an administrative office temp worker while appearing in New York stage productions.

Acting career
Throughout her entire acting career, Hance was credited under her birth name of Heather Donahue.

Her first screen appearance, and her best known role, is in the 1999 found-footage horror film The Blair Witch Project. She and the two other main cast members, Michael C. Williams and Joshua Leonard, used their birth names as their character names for the film. She would come to regret this later in life, changing her name to Hance years after she retired from acting.

The Blair Witch Project 
Her role in the film originated in 1997, when she read about an audition that was being advertised in Backstage magazine for actors with strong improvisational abilities, which were needed for an independent horror film. She auditioned at the Musical Theater Works in New York City and was cast in one of the three principal roles. For the role, Hance had to learn how to operate a camera, spending two days in a crash course. She said she modeled her character after a director that she once worked with, citing the character's self-assuredness when everything went as planned, and confusion during crisis. After filming, Hance and the two other leads were asked not to appear on any television shows or in any films, as the filmmakers made great advertising efforts to portray the events in the film as factual, including the distribution of flyers at festivals such as the Sundance Film Festival, asking viewers to come forward with any information about the "missing" students. The IMDb page for the film also listed the actors as "missing, presumed dead" in the first year of the film's availability. The promotion for the film was so convincing that Hance's mother received sympathy cards from people who believed that her daughter was actually dead or missing.

Once released, the film received unexpected acclaim from critics and became a resounding box office success–grossing over US$248 million worldwide, making it one of the most successful independent movies of all time. Despite the film's highly positive reception, Hance's performance received a mixed reaction. While being nominated for a Blockbuster Entertainment Award for Favorite Actress – Newcomer, and an Online Film Critics Society Award for Best Actress, she was also nominated for worst actress at the Stinkers Bad Movie Awards, and won in the same category at the Golden Raspberry Awards.

Hance later admitted there was a considerable amount of backlash against her because of her association with the film, which led to her having threatening encounters with people, and difficulty finding other employment.

Later roles
A year after the release of The Blair Witch Project, she appeared in the independent film Home Field Advantage, and alongside Freddie Prinze, Jr. and Jason Biggs in the romantic comedy Boys and Girls.

In 2001, she appeared in the independent film Seven and a Match and in the short film The Velvet Tigress, again credited as Donahue. 

In 2002, she had a co-starring role in the science fiction miniseries Taken, for which she was nominated for a Saturn Award for Best Supporting Actress on Television. The same year, she appeared in an array of short films and televised films, such as The Walking Hack of Asbury Park, New Suit and The Big Time. In 2005, she guest-starred in an episode of the comedy series It's Always Sunny in Philadelphia. Her last acting role was in the 2008 direct-to-DVD horror film The Morgue.

Life after acting
Hance left acting in 2008 to become a medical marijuana grower. In 2011, she signed a publishing deal for her debut book Growgirl, about her time as a marijuana grower, which was released on January 5, 2012 under the Heather Donahue name by Gotham Books. 

, she was residing in Nevada City, California. At the time, she was also reported to be developing a line of herbal skin-care products.

In a 2016 interview in GQ, she discussed the ongoing challenges associated with having used her birth name in The Blair Witch Projecta name she was still using at the time of the interview. The same interview revealed that she was writing for, and intended to produce, a sitcom tentatively called The High Country, based on her experiences in marijuana farming. Sometime after that interview, and before 2021, she formally changed her name to Rei Hance. 

During the development of the 2016 sequel to The Blair Witch Project, she was contacted by the film's producers for permission to use her name and likeness in the film, which she later stated was a difficult decision:

Hance was paid a sum of money for the use of her likeness in the sequel, and stated in a 2021 interview that she "took that money and just drove around North America, getting shitfaced for about two years, and hoping I would die. I did not want to be alive anymore." She subsequently relocated to Maine and became sober. She is a practicing Buddhist.

Filmography

Film

Television

References

External links

1974 births
20th-century American actresses
21st-century American actresses
21st-century American businesswomen
21st-century American businesspeople
Actresses from Pennsylvania
American Buddhists
American film actresses
American memoirists
American stage actresses
American television actresses
American women memoirists
Businesspeople in the cannabis industry
Cannabis writers
Living people
People from Nevada City, California
People from Upper Darby Township, Pennsylvania